Pila-Canale is a commune in the Corse-du-Sud department of France on the island of Corsica.

Geography

Climate
Pila-Canale has a mediterranean climate (Köppen climate classification Csa).

Calzola bridge 

The Calzola bridge, at the border with Casalabriva, has two bends seemingly due to a misalignment of the two extremities of the bridge.

Population

See also
Communes of the Corse-du-Sud department

References

Communes of Corse-du-Sud
Corse-du-Sud communes articles needing translation from French Wikipedia